You Were Right is the sixth studio album by American singer-songwriter Brendan Benson. The album was released in December 2013 under Benson's own label Readymade Records in the US, and Lojinx in Europe.

Track listing

Personnel
Brendan Benson - Composer
Michael Andrews - Composer
Ashley Monroe - Composer
Sarah Siskind - Composer
Young Hines - Composer
Ken Stringfellow - Bass, Keyboards
Seth Timbs - Bass
Jon Auer - Bass, Guitar
Dean Fertita - Keyboards
Brad Pemberton - Drums
Matt Mahaffey - Drums

Credits
Tyler Bergfield - Cover
Adriel Denae - Photography
Laura Keating - Layout
Chris Mara - Engineer
Greg Thompson - Assistant Engineer
David Towne - Mastering Assistant
Tommy Wiggins - Mastering

References

2013 albums
Brendan Benson albums
Lojinx albums